Ľudmila Bezáková, married name Siroťáková, is a former competitive figure skater who represented Czechoslovakia internationally. She is the 1969 Nebelhorn Trophy champion, 1972 Winter Universiade silver medalist, and a two-time Czechoslovak national champion (1970–71). Bezáková competed at three European Championships, achieving her best result, 8th, in 1970 in Leningrad. She was also sent to three World Championships with her highest placement was 11th in 1972 in Calgary. Hilda Múdra and Ivan Mauer coached her in Bratislava.

Competitive highlights

References

Czechoslovak female single skaters
Slovak female single skaters
Living people
Figure skaters from Bratislava
Year of birth missing (living people)
Universiade silver medalists for Czechoslovakia
Universiade medalists in figure skating
Competitors at the 1972 Winter Universiade